Jeffrey Arthur Darey (26 February 1934 – January 2014) was an English professional footballer who played  as a forward in the Football League for Brighton & Hove Albion. He also played non-League football for clubs including Wimbledon, Hendon and Guildford City. While a Wimbledon player, Darey was capped four times for the England amateur team.

References

1934 births
2014 deaths
Footballers from Hammersmith
English footballers
England amateur international footballers
Association football forwards
Wimbledon F.C. players
Hendon F.C. players
Brighton & Hove Albion F.C. players
Guildford City F.C. players
Isthmian League players
English Football League players